Mary Joe Fernández was the defending champion but did not compete that year.

Conchita Martínez won in the final 6–4, 6–4 against Amélie Mauresmo.

Seeds
The top eight seeds received a bye to the second round.

Draw

Finals

Top half

Section 1

Section 2

Bottom half

Section 3

Section 4

References
 1998 WTA German Open Draw

WTA German Open
1998 WTA Tour